Blood Relations is a play by David Malouf. Set in tropical Western Australia, it concerns a family group gathering around patriarch Willy at Christmas. It has been described as an Australian re-telling of The Tempest. 

First produced in a Sydney Theatre Company and State Theatre Company of South Australia co-production, it opened on 24 June 1987 at the Sydney Opera House's Drama Theatre directed by Jim Sharman.

Blood Relations received the 1987 NSW Premier's Literary Award in the Play category.

References 

1987 plays
Australian plays